Run(s) or RUN may refer to:

Places
 Run (island), one of the Banda Islands in Indonesia
 Run (stream), a stream in the Dutch province of North Brabant

People
 Run (rapper), Joseph Simmons, now known as "Reverend Run", from the hip-hop group Run–DMC
 Giacomo Bufarini, known as RUN, Italian artist based in London, UK

Arts, entertainment, and media

Films
 Run (1991 film), an American action thriller film
 Run, a 1994 Hong Kong film featuring Leon Lai
 Run (2002 film), an Indian Tamil film directed by N. Linguswamy starring Madhavan
 Run (2004 film), an Indian film, a Hindi remake of the Tamil film
 Run, a 2009 Croatian film directed by Nevio Marasović
 Run, a 2013 film featuring William Moseley
 The Run (2013 film), Malaysian film also known by it Malay-language title Lari
 Run (2014 film), a French-Ivorian film
 Run (2016 film), an Indian Telugu film
 The Run (film), a 2017 Australian-Indian documentary
 Run (2019 British film), a British drama film
 Run (2020 Indian film), a 2020 Indian Telugu-language psychological thriller film directed by Lakshmikanth Chenna
 Run (2020 American film), an American thriller film

Games
 Run (cards), a series of playing cards with consecutive values
 Need for Speed: The Run, a 2011 racing video game

Literature 
 Run (novel), a novel by Ann Patchett
 The Run (novel), a novel by Stuart Woods
 Run, a novel in the Fearless series by Francine Pascal
 Run, a novel by Eric Walters

Music

Albums 
 Run (Alison Wonderland album), 2015
 Run (Awolnation album), 2015
 Run (B'z album), 1992
 Run (Sanctus Real album), 2013
 Run (Tofubeats album), 2018
 Run, a 2001 album by Nine Mile

Songs 
 "Ran" (song), 2013, by Luna Sea, incorrectly romanized as "Run" by the band
 "Run" (Amy Macdonald song), 2008
 "Run" (Becky Hill and Galantis song), 2022
 "Run" (BTS song), 2015
 "Run" (Cog song), 2005
 "Run" (Foo Fighters song), 2017
 "Run" (George song), 2001
 "Run" (George Strait song), 2001
 "Run" (Jesse & Joy song), 2011
 "Run" (Joji song), 2020
 "Run" (Kita Alexander song), 2022
 "Run" (Lighthouse Family song), 2002
 "Run" (Matt Nathanson and Sugarland song), 2011
 "Run" (Nicole Scherzinger song), 2014
 "Run" (OneRepublic song), 2021
 "Run" (Red Flag song), 2009
 "Run" (Sash! song), featuring Boy George, 2002
 "Run" (Snow Patrol song), 2004, covered by Leona Lewis
 "Run" (Vampire Weekend song), 2010
 "Run (I'm a Natural Disaster)", 2008, by Gnarls Barkley
 "Run 2", 1989, by New Order
 "Run", by Air from Talkie Walkie
 "Run", by Awolnation from Run
 "Run", by Bell Biv DeVoe from Three Stripes
 "Run", by Bring Me the Horizon from That's the Spirit
 "Run", by Broadcast 2000
 "Run", by Cappadonna from The Pillage
 "Run", by Collective Soul from Dosage
 "Run", by Disturbed from Indestructible
 "Run", by Epik High from Epilogue
 "Run", a 2012 song by Flo Rida from Wild Ones
 "Run", by Ghostface Killah from The Pretty Toney Album
 "Run", by Jimmy Barnes featuring Mica Paris from Double Happiness
 "Run", by the Knux from Eraser
 "Run", by Kutless from the self-titled album
 "Run", by Leessang
 "Run", by Luminous
 "Run", a 2012 song by Pink from The Truth About Love
 "Run", by Rex Goudie
 "Run", by Sandie Shaw
 "Run", by Seth Sentry
 "Run", by Shihad, under the name Pacifier, from Pacifier
 "Run", by Shinhwa from Volume 9
 "Run", by Spiderbait from Shashavaglava
 "Run", by Stephen Fretwell
 "Run", a 2021 song by Taylor Swift featuring Ed Sheeran from Red (Taylor's Version)
 "Run", by Tiggs Da Author featuring Lady Leshurr
 "Run", by Toby Fox, a track from the soundtrack of the 2015 video game Undertale
 "Run", by Tony Jay, under the name Shere Khan, from the video game The Jungle Book Groove Party
 "Run", by Tyler, the Creator from Cherry Bomb
 "Run", by Zeal & Ardor from Zeal & Ardor
 "Run (Run Run Run)", by Flobots from The Circle in the Square

Other uses in music
 Run (music), a musicology term for a short rapid series of notes
 Run–DMC, a hip hop group

Television
 Run (American TV series), a 2020 comedy thriller series
 Run (Indian TV series), a 2019 Tamil-language thriller series
 Run (British TV series), a 2013 British drama series
 Run (South Korean TV series), a 2020 variety show
 "Run!", an episode of Heroes
 "Run" (Scandal), an episode of Scandal
 "Run", an episode of Smallville
 "Run", an episode of Without a Trace

Other uses in arts, entertainment, and media
 Run (magazine), a computer magazine of the 1980s

Codes
 RUN, IATA code for Roland Garros Airport, Saint-Denis, Réunion
 RUN, ICAO code for ACT Airlines, a Turkey-based cargo airline
 Run, ISO 639-2 and -3 code for Kirundi language

Computing and technology 
 Run command, a command used to begin execution of a program
 Run, a sequence of something repeated, in computer coding
 Run-length encoding, a run of a single value

Earth science
 Run (waterfalls), the horizontal distance a waterfall flows
 Stream or run, a flowing body of water

Sports 
 Run (American football), an offensive action in American football
 Run (baseball), the unit of scoring in baseball
 Run (cricket), the unit of scoring in cricket
 Run, in basketball terminology, an interval in which one team heavily outscores the other
 Run, in sailing, to sail downwind
 Run, the unit of scoring in softball
 Run, a variety of events in track and field
 Piste or ski run, a marked trail down a mountain for winter sports
 Running, moving swiftly on foot

Other uses
 Run, a mathematical term for an x-axis span, compared to rise (a y-axis span); the equation rise over run calculates the slope of a line
 Bank run, a mass withdrawal by many people of money from a bank
 Market run, similar to a bank run but concerning products and not cash
 Diarrhea or "the runs", an intestinal disease
 Regional Universities Network (RUN), a network of six universities primarily from Australia
 Sheep run, early Australian / New Zealand term for a sheep station operated by squatters
Run, in textiles, a progressive unravelling of stockings, pantyhose or tights.

See also 
 
 International Research Universities Network (IRUN)
 Run Run Run (disambiguation)
 Running (disambiguation)